The Rivers railway station is on the Canadian National Railway mainline in Rivers, Manitoba, in the centre of town.  The station is served by Via Rail's The Canadian.  The station operates as a flag stop with 48-hour advance notice.

The station was originally built in 1917 for the Grand Trunk Pacific Railway. The station building is a 1½ story structure made of concrete to halfway up the first story, brick to the roof line.   The station building was closed in the 1990s, however trains continued to serve the community as a flag stop.  The station was designated a national historic site in 1992. A local community group is working on restoring the building.

Stranding 
On March 1, 2011, Via passengers traveling east were stranded for 15 hours due to a Canadian National freight train becoming disabled near Rivers. The line was reopened, but this delay suspended Via's service between Winnipeg and Toronto in both directions.  Consequently, Via had to make arrangements to accommodate about 70 affected passengers, including providing alternate transportation for them. Regular service was expected to resume the following Thursday for the Winnipeg to Toronto route, and on the next Saturday for the opposite direction.

References

External links 

Community Group with Grant To Restore The Station 
Via Rail Station Information

Via Rail stations in Manitoba
Railway stations in Manitoba
Railway stations in Canada opened in 1917
Designated Heritage Railway Stations in Manitoba
1917 establishments in Manitoba